Limenaria (meaning: covelets) is a village on the island of Thasos in northern Greece. The village numbers 2480 residents (2011 census) and is the second largest settlement on the island of Thasos. The settlement is a popular tourist destination since the 1960s, with a 1.2 km long strand of beach (Stelakis Beach) and a number of smaller coves and pebbly beaches just to the west of the settlement next to the village of Trypiti (Τρυπητή), being the main tourist magnet for the locality. The village is also popular for tourists around the island for a visible view of the Holy Site of Mount Athos.

References

External links
 Official municipality website

Populated places in Thasos